Paddy Maguire (born 26 September 1948) is a, former bantamweight boxer from the Falls Road area of Belfast, Northern Ireland. He was a Commonwealth Games silver medal winner and one-time holder of the BBBC bantamweight title.

Amateur career
Maguire, who was born in Belfast, represented Northern Ireland at the 1966 Commonwealth Games. At the games he won a silver medal in the bantamweight division.

Professional career highlights
Maguire's first professional fight was on 4 March 1969 when he fought Bernard Nicholls and won on points.
 
His first title fight was on 20 February 1973, at the Royal Albert Hall. He was fighting for the British bantamweight title, his opponent was Johnny Clark. Maguire lost on points.

Maguire's second attempt at the bantamweight title was on 10 December 1974, at Nottingham ice rink. His opponent was Dave Needham, Maguire again lost on points. On 20 October 1975 Maguire's third attempt to win the British bantamweight title was successful. This time he beat Dave Needham, winning by a technical knockout in the 14th round.

Maguire had two unsuccessful attempts to win the European Boxing Union (EBU) bantamweight title.His first attempt took place at Cluses, France on 16 January 1976. His opponent was Daniel Trioulaire, the fight was a draw.The second attempt took place at Cagliari, Sardinia on 28 September 1977. His opponent was Franco Zurlo, Maguire lost on a technical knockout in the 8th round.

Maguire lost his British bantamweight title on 29 November 1977, at the National Sporting Club, Piccadilly. His opponent was relative newcomer Johnny Owen, Maguire lost on a technical knockout in the 11th round. This was to be Maguire's last fight.

Retirement
Maguire retired from professional boxing in 1977 aged 29. A few years back, he was in a car accident which has caused him to avoid driving ever since. He made it through his injuries and is now well. He is still involved in the sport and is currently serving as a Council Member on the Northern Ireland Area Council of the British Boxing Board of Control

Conservative politician Colin Moynihan is recorded in Hansard as having once sparred with the retired Maguire at the Thomas A Becket public house on London's Old Kent Road.

See also
List of British bantamweight boxing champions

References

External links

1948 births
Living people
Male boxers from Northern Ireland
Boxers from Belfast
Bantamweight boxers
Commonwealth Games medallists in boxing
Commonwealth Games silver medallists for Northern Ireland
Boxers at the 1966 British Empire and Commonwealth Games
Medallists at the 1966 British Empire and Commonwealth Games